Edgar Lewis Jones (4 May 1910 – 11 February 1986) was a Welsh rugby union, and professional rugby league footballer who played in the 1920s and 1930s. He played representative level rugby union (RU) for Wales, at invitational level for Barbarian F.C., and at club level for Gowerton RFC and Llanelli RFC, as a prop, i.e. number 1 or 3, and club level rugby league (RL) for Leeds.

Background
Jones was born in Sketty, Swansea, Wales, and he died aged 75 in West Cross, Swansea, Wales.

International honours
Edgar Jones won caps for Wales (RU) while at Llanelli RFC in 1930 against France, in 1933 against England, Scotland, and Ireland, and in 1935 against England.

References

External links
Search for "Jones" at rugbyleagueproject.org

Statistics at scrum.com
Statistics at wru.co.uk

1910 births
1986 deaths
Footballers who switched code
Llanelli RFC players
Gowerton RFC players
Barbarian F.C. players
Leeds Rhinos players
Rugby league players from Swansea
Rugby union players from Swansea
Rugby union props
Wales international rugby union players
Welsh rugby league players
Welsh rugby union players